Pau Torres Riba (born 4 June 1987) is a Spanish footballer who plays for UCAM Murcia CF as a goalkeeper.

Club career
Born in Capellades, Barcelona, Catalonia, Torres finished his development with FC Barcelona, representing its C and B sides in the Tercera División. On 14 July 2008 he joined Segunda División B club Terrassa FC, going on to compete in that tier the following years with UE Sant Andreu, CD San Roque de Lepe, AD Ceuta and Lleida Esportiu.

On 17 June 2015, after three full seasons as an undisputed starter at Lleida, Torres signed a one-year deal with Segunda División side Deportivo Alavés. He made his professional debut on 19 March of the following year, keeping a clean sheet in a home draw against CD Lugo.

A backup to Fernando Pacheco, Torres appeared in only two league matches during the campaign as the Basques returned to La Liga after ten years. On 27 June 2016, he terminated his contract and joined Real Valladolid for one year on 8 July.

A year later, Torres signed a two-year deal at FC Cartagena in the third division, and helped the team win their group, though they missed out on promotion with a 1–0 play-off final loss to Extremadura UD in June 2018. In August that year, he returned to Lleida.

Honours
Alavés
Segunda División: 2015–16

References

External links

1987 births
Living people
People from Anoia
Sportspeople from the Province of Barcelona
Spanish footballers
Footballers from Catalonia
Association football goalkeepers
Segunda División players
Segunda División B players
Tercera División players
Primera Federación players
Segunda Federación players
FC Barcelona C players
FC Barcelona Atlètic players
Terrassa FC footballers
UE Sant Andreu footballers
CD San Roque de Lepe footballers
AD Ceuta footballers
Lleida Esportiu footballers
Deportivo Alavés players
Real Valladolid players
FC Cartagena footballers
Zamora CF footballers
UCAM Murcia CF players